Alli Thandha Vaanam is a 2001 Indian Tamil-language masala film directed by Sreedhar Prasadh (VIJI). The film stars Prabhu Deva, Laila and Neha Bajpai, with Prakash Raj, Vivek, Moulee and Rajeev playing supporting roles. Murali appeared in a guest role. The film score and the soundtrack were composed by Vidyasagar. The film was released on 5 September 2001.

Plot 
Sathyam is the carefree son of a rich businessman, owner of Sathyam Mills Lakshmipathi. He has been in New York for his college studies and returns to Coimbatore after 5 years. Prakash, Sathyam's cousin, has continuously spoiled Satyam by secretly sending him money to spend away in the US, as Prakash wants to inherit Sathyam Mills. Disappointed by Sathyam's bohemian behaviour, Lakshmipathi asks Satyam to spend three months alone on the streets of Chennai to learn the value of money. He would have no money and could not use the information of who he is or his education (paid by his father), to gain favour or make a living from anyone.

So Sathyam sets out and from the very start, meets Divya, who plays an overexuberant 21 year girl, who cries or laughs constantly. In the next frame, he saves Meenakshi in the style of MGR from would-be rapists, and in the third, he meets Julie, they both take each other as siblings. Sathyam promises Julie that he will help find her mother. Together they set out on a journey in search of her mum and to make a living (to survive to meet the daily need; food, shelter and medicine). Julie has her own sad story. He sees Meenakshi again, and the two of them fall in love.

Julie and Sathyam steal a suitcase from Madhavan (Murali) but later that night find out it is full of medicine. Without his medicine, Madhavan falls unconscious. Satyam goes to return the medicine and finds him unconscious. He then takes him to the hospital and learns he is going to need ₹ 5 lakhs to save him as he almost inadvertently killed him.

So Satyam enters the house of billionaire (Rajeev) Divya's father, pretending to be his long-lost son Madhavan. He clears all confusion, reunites Madhavan with his dad and convinces Divya to let go of him. Prakash finds out about Sathyam and plans to kill him. Madhavan and Sathyam defeat Prakash and hand him over to the Police. Sathyam marries Meena and returns to his home with success.

Cast 

Prabhu Deva as Sathyam (Sathya)
Laila as Divya
Neha Bajpai as Meenakshi (Meena)
Prakash Raj as Prakash, Sathyam's cousin
Vivek as Tamil Kirukkan
Moulee as Lakshmipathi
Rajeev as Ramanathan (Divya's Father)
Hemanth Ravan as Sharma
Mahanadi Shankar as a Police inspector
Balu Anand as Ramanathan
Laxmi Rattan as Doctor Chezhiyan
Baby Kalyani as Julie
Kottachi as Tamil Kirukkan's friend
Muthukaalai as Servant
Jayamani as Mestri
Indhu as a Construction worker
Shanthi Williams as Kannamma, Meenakshi's mother
Tharini as Julie's mother
Priyanka as Servant
Lekhasri as a Construction worker
Meenal as Sudha
A. C. Murali Mohan as TV Host
Vengal Rao as Henchman
Kili Ramachandran as Shop owner
Bonda Mani as Sri Lankan Tamil man
Dhadha Muthukumar as Old man
Sivanarayanamoorthy as Company manager
Minnal Deepa as Hospital receptionist
Surjith Ansary as Schoolboy
Murali as Madhavan, Divya's half-brother (guest appearance)

Production 
The role played by Murali was initially intended to be played by Karthik. Similarly Laila replaced Sneha in the lead female role.

Soundtrack 
The film score and the soundtrack were composed by Vidyasagar. The soundtrack features 7 tracks. Vidyasagar later reused "Vaadi Vaadi" as "Elu Elu Eloroda" for Telugu film Ottesi Cheputunna. The hook music of "Vaadi Vaadi" was used in song "Aa Re Pritam Pyare" in the Hindi film Rowdy Rathore.

References

External links 
 

2001 films
2000s Tamil-language films
Films shot in Malaysia
Films set in Chennai
2000s masala films
Films scored by Vidyasagar